This article is a list of historic places in Laval, entered on the Canadian Register of Historic Places, whether they are federal, provincial, or municipal. All addresses are in the administrative Region 13. For all other listings in the province of Quebec, see List of historic places in Quebec.

Laval
Laval, Quebec